Carneddau ponies live in the Carneddau mountains in north Wales/gogledd Cymru, in the Parc Cenedlaethol Eryri/ (Snowdonia) National Park. They are a  Mountain pony standing at 10-11 hands DNA identification in 2013 that they are a distinct, unique and ancient breed having been isolated in the Carneddau for many centuries. "A study of their DNA shows they have been isolated for at least several hundred years, according to researchers at Aberystwyth University.""Clare Winton, an IBERS post-graduate student who performed the study as part of her Ph.D thesis revealed: “Although the Carneddau ponies have shared ancestry with the Welshpony, they exhibit genetic signatures such as unique mutations while maintaining high genetic diversity, demonstrating that the population has been isolated for at least several hundred years. Therefore, the Carneddau ponies are a genetically distinct population.” 

Clare Winton's thesis "Genetic diversity and phylogenetic analysis of native mountain ponies of Britain and Ireland reveal a novel rare population" where she and her colleagues state "Our results establish that the feral Carneddau ponies represent a unique and distinctive population that merits recognition as a defined population and conservation priority" can be seen here. The population of the Carneddau ponies is in the hundreds [ 2020 ]but fluctuates being affected by the weather. In 2013 100s died in the heavy snow of that winter, but the population recovered in a few years.

Carneddau ponies are not given supplementary feed like some semi-feral ponies and have " .. a wider, diet than domestic ponies, [and ] will eat soft rush, Molinia, gorse and mountain grasses."

They can feed themselves in winter by scraping the snow of the grass, a trait shared only with other British isles ponies, but done more often as they get no supplementary feed. See this in the BBC's Winterheros from the winter of 2020/21.

The ponies while semi-feral are owned by 7 local families who once a year round them up for health checks and to allow some ponies to be sold to keep the herd in balance. In the past the Carneddau ponies were been sold for working use e.g. for Pit Ponys, but now are sold only for leisure.

These families are grouped in the Carneddau Pony Society of whom Gareth Wyn Jones is the leading spokesperson and protector of the herd, see being interviewed here "Wild as the Hills - The protection of the Carneddau Mountain wild ponies"

References 

 https://www.cnp.org.uk/blog/carneddau-ponies-wildlife-warriors-snowdonia-national-park

Ponies
Snowdonia